Ścinawka Górna  is a village in the administrative district of Gmina Radków, within Kłodzko County, Lower Silesian Voivodeship, in south-western Poland.

Attractions

The village includes the hamlet of Sarny with its imposing 16th-century castle and 19th-century park. The castle, owned for centuries by Czech, Habsburg and then German noblemen, in 1866 was the birthplace of Gustav Adolf von Götzen, German Governor of German East Africa.

References

Villages in Kłodzko County